USS John Adams may refer to the following ships of the United States Navy:

  was a frigate, launched in 1799 and sold in 1867
 , was a  commissioned in 1964 and decommissioned in 1989

See also
 

United States Navy ship names